Another War is a role-playing video game set in World War II. The game was released for PC on September 30, 2002 by Czech publisher Cenega. It was later released for Mac on December 31.

Plot
Another War follows the story of an adventurer involved in his own private war during World War II in Nazi-occupied Europe. 

The plot starts off in a small town in Nazi-occupied France, where a friend of the playable character is captured by Nazis and imprisoned in a castle near the town.

References

Video games developed in Poland
Windows games
MacOS games
Role-playing video games
2002 video games